The Dress is an East German comedy film directed by Konrad Petzold and Egon Günther. It was released in 1961.

Cast
 Wolf Kaiser as Kaiser Max
 Horst Drinda as Hans - Tuchwebergeselle
 Werner Lierck as Kumpan - Tuchwebergeselle
 Lore Frisch as Bekleidungsminister
 Gerd E. Schäfer as Außenminister
 Kurt Rackelmann as Innenminister
 Erik S. Klein as Küchenminister
 Eva-Maria Hagen as Katrin
 Günther Simon as Fleischer
 Hans Klering as Holzauge
 Harry Gillmann as Schnapsnase
 Gerhard Rachold as Latte
 Harry Riebauer as Der Tünne

External links
 

1961 films
1961 comedy films
German comedy films
East German films
1960s German-language films
Films based on works by Hans Christian Andersen
Films directed by Egon Günther
Works based on The Emperor's New Clothes

Films_based_on_fairy_tales
1960s German films